Peter O. Phillips (born June 21, 1970), better known by his stage name Pete Rock, is an American music producer, DJ and rapper. He is widely recognized as one of the greatest hip hop producers of all time, and is often mentioned alongside DJ Premier, RZA, Q-Tip and J Dilla as one of the mainstays of 1990s East Coast hip hop production. He rose to prominence in the early 1990s as one half of the critically acclaimed group Pete Rock & CL Smooth. Early on in his career, he was also famed for his remix work.

After the duo went their separate ways, Rock continued with a solo career that has garnered him worldwide respect, though little in the way of mainstream success. Along with groups such as Stetsasonic, Gang Starr, A Tribe Called Quest and The Roots, Rock played a major role in the merging of elements from jazz into hip hop music (also known as jazz rap). Pete Rock is also the older brother and younger cousin, respectively, of rappers Grap Luva and Heavy D.

Biography

Early life
Pete Rock was born in The Bronx in New York City, New York the fourth of five children born to Jamaican immigrant parents. His family moved to Mount Vernon, New York when he was seven years old. During high school, he met his future recording partner CL Smooth. He briefly attended John Jay College of Criminal Justice but was not a serious student and left to focus on his music career. According to Rock, his father was also a part-time DJ who had an impressive record collection. Rock would often accompany his father to a cricket club called Wembley in The Bronx and watch as he spun records for the guests. His first job was as a paperboy, in his neighborhood.

Solo career

Rock oversaw the production of Jay Stay Paid, a posthumous album by the producer J Dilla, released June 2, 2009, on Nature Sounds. Following that, Pete Rock joined Kanye West in Hawaii, who traveled there to work on the latter's fifth album, My Beautiful Dark Twisted Fantasy. In addition, he and DJ Premier have announced that they are working on a joint album together, although further details are unknown. In London, he confirmed that Big Pooh and C.L. Smooth will be on his half of the VS album and he planned on releasing five albums in 2011, including reuniting with C.L. Smooth for a third album, and dropping his fourth album on Nature Sounds. His next few collaborative albums are both due for a summer release with Monumental first then with Camp Lo's "80 Blocks From Tiffanys" LP. In an April 2011 interview on Conspiracy Worldwide Radio, Pete Rock discussed his new solo work including his album with DJ Premier, as well as exploring the fact that he has had numerous beats rejected by Eminem over the years  Pete Rock Uncensored Radio Interview. In an August 2011 interview, he has confirmed the completion of the Camp Lo album "80 Blocks from Tiffany's" and that he is currently working on production for Torae's album, Elzhi & his own solo album PeteStrumentals 2. Pete Rock announced on Twitter that PeteStrumentals 2 is indeed confirmed finished and scheduled for a 2015 release. The project was released on June 23, 2015, on the indie label Mello Music Group. On January 2, 2019, Rock posted a trailer video on his Instagram page announcing that new works will be coming soon, including Return of the SP1200 (which was released on April 13, 2019, exclusively on vinyl (Record Store Day) and released digitally on April 26, 2019), PeteStrumentals 3 (a continuation to 2001's PeteStrumentals and 2015's 2), Don't Smoke Rock 2 (also a continuation to Don't Smoke Rock) featuring Smoke DZA, and an album with rapper Skyzoo. Rock confirms to Okayplayer that he is working on his sixth instrumental album called PeteStrumentals 4, another continuation to Rock's previous PeteStrumentals series releases. The project was finished on June 30 and it's scheduled for a 2022 release on Tru Soul records. The project was released on March 31, 2022.

Affiliates

Proteges
Through the years, Rock has helped to jump-start the careers of several artists. His first project outside of Pete Rock & CL Smooth was the hardcore duo YG'z, who released an EP called Street Nigga in 1993, with four out of the six tracks produced by Rock; however, they were quickly dropped from their deal with Reprise Records. His next venture, INI, was a group featuring Rock, his younger brother Grap Luva, Ras G and rapper Rob-O. They released a single, "Fakin' Jax", through Elektra Records in 1995, before their debut album, Center of Attention, was shelved by the label. The other two members continue to record solo material, albeit only sporadically. In an interview Rock elaborated on the situation:

Relationship with CL Smooth
Since their split in 1995, Pete Rock's relationship with CL Smooth has been highly unpredictable. Although the pair briefly united for the reflective "Da Two" from Rock's Soul Survivor album in 1998, they avoided entertaining requests for a reunion album until 2001, when they once again teamed up for "Back on Da Block" from Rock's PeteStrumentals. In their interviews during this period, it appeared as though a new album was underway. As Rock would explain:

The pair went on a short international tour culminating in their well-received show at London's Jazz Cafe; however, soon after this they declined to comment any further on the new album, which never materialized (although Smooth did make three separate appearances on Soul Survivor II).  Eventually, Smooth would confirm rumors of a rift in an interview with AllHipHop.com, in which he appeared angry and frustrated with his former partner, saying "I didn't ask him to be a superhero" and "I'm not the problem". In an interview taken in December 2006, Rock ruled out any further collaborations with Smooth but stated that he holds no grudges against his former partner.

Musical style

Production

Pete Rock creates beats from samples, the majority of which are taken from obscure R&B, funk, and jazz records. Early on in his career he would also sample drum breaks such as Black Heat's "Zimba Ku" for Heavy D & The Boyz's "Letter To The Future". Pete Rock heavily used the E-mu SP-1200 as well as the Akai S950—later moving onto using the MPC—for his productions. Pete Rock tends to use the samples as palettes for his beats, chopping (cutting the sample into smaller parts), filtering (altering the frequencies of the sample), and layering several samples, often within the same song. While this technique was applied long before Rock (on De La Soul's Three Feet High and Rising or the work of The Bomb Squad for example), Rock's work is distinctive for the way in which he uses samples to achieve a hazy, droning effect. He is also noted for his resonant basslines, horn samples, and gritty sounding drums. His beats often sound as though they were being played from an old vinyl record; he samples many of his sounds straight off these records. He frequently recorded at Greene St. Recording in Manhattan, having liked the equalizer that was used there, which gave many of his productions a wah-wah effect.

Another trait of his, more so in the earlier part of his career, is the way he uses horn samples to supplement his grooves. On "They Reminisce Over You (T.R.O.Y.)", Rock uses a horn sample from Tom Scott's "Today"; he has also used horns on  "Straighten It Out", Public Enemy's "Shut 'Em Down", Rah Digga's "What They Call Me", and A.D.O.R.'s "Let It All Hang Out".

Along with Gang Starr, The Roots and A Tribe Called Quest, Pete Rock played a large role in the fusing of jazz and funk music into hip hop. The aforementioned "Reminisce..." withstanding, Rock used many jazz samples on his album Mecca and The Soul Brother, such as Cannonball Adderley's "Country Preacher", for the song "Return of the Mecca", or "Capricorn" for the song "In the House" from The Main Ingredient. Pete Rock's heavy use of intro and outro beats has also been widely influential. To introduce feature songs, he often plays a short instrumental excerpt, completely different from the rest of the song.  Aside from their role as transitions, these are widely regarded as a way of displaying his large collection and as a challenge to other hip-hop producers to identify the records that the breaks come from. Mecca & the Soul Brother and The Main Ingredient use intro/outro beats on nearly every track to great effect, and the tradition continues to the present on Rock's recent releases.

Remixes
"Another Pete Rock Remix" is Pete Rock's trademark catchphrase, heard on countless singles that he has remixed. In addition to hip-hop artists he has done remix work for artists from other genres such as his 1995 remix of "Before You Walk Out Of My Life" for R&B singer Monica. In 1992 he collaborated with Mary J. Blige on the What's the 411? single "Reminisce", which utilized the same sample from his own single "They Reminisce Over You (T.R.O.Y.)". Rock claims to have done several high-profile remixes that remain unreleased, including one of Madonna's "Secret". He also claims to have produced the original beat for The Notorious B.I.G.'s "Juicy" and that it was recreated by P. Diddy and Poke (of Tone & Poke fame), without consent. However, he was invited to produce the remix, which utilizes the same sample as the original—Mtume's "Juicy Fruit". Although he received no official producer credit, he made the original demo beat for A Tribe Called Quest's "Jazz (We've Got)", which was then recreated by Q-Tip on the album The Low End Theory. He remixed Public Enemy's "Shut 'em Down" and "Nighttrain" in the same day, starting at 12pm and finishing at 12am.

Up until 2003, he created all of his productions on the E-mu SP-1200, thereafter using the Akai MPC2000XL. He also has a collection of about 90,000 records and looks for records at least once a week. Pete Rock was one of nine artists who participated in thetruth.com's Remix Project, where he remixed the Sunny Side song "Magical Amount".

Influence
Pete Rock has had a considerable impact on a number of record producers who have emerged in the hip hop scene since the late 1990s. Critics have favorably compared Detroit producer J Dilla and North Carolina's 9th Wonder to Rock; both of them worked with Rock during their recording careers. Several of the comparisons stem from the fact that these producers have created the bulk of their productions out of samples, as well as the warm, mellow, and exuberant undertones apparent in their work. Pete Rock himself has added validation to the comparisons with J Dilla by stating "he's the only producer in this game that was just as serious [as me]."

Discography

Studio albums
 Soul Survivor (1998)
 Soul Survivor II (2004)
 NY's Finest (2008)
 Soul Survivor 3 (TBA)

Collaboration albums
 Mecca and the Soul Brother (with CL Smooth) (1992)
 The Main Ingredient (with CL Smooth) (1994)
 My Own Worst Enemy (with Ed O.G.) (2004)
 80 Blocks from Tiffany's (with Camp Lo) (2011)
 Monumental (with Smif-N-Wessun) (2011)
 80 Blocks from Tiffany's 2 (with Camp Lo) (2013) [had a 2020 re-release]
 Don't Smoke Rock (with Smoke DZA) (2016)
 Retropolitan (with Skyzoo) (2019)
 21 Grams: Worth It's Weight In Soul (with AMXXR) (2021)

Collaboration EPs
 All Souled Out (with CL Smooth) (1991)
 The Basement Demos (with CL Smooth) (2009)
 C (with Canibus) (2022)

Instrumental albums
 PeteStrumentals (2001)
 The Surviving Elements: From Soul Survivor II Sessions (2005)
 PeteStrumentals 2 (2015)
 Lost Sessions (2017)
 Return of the SP1200 (2019)
 PeteStrumentals 3 (with the Soul Brothers) (2020)
 PeteStrumentals 4 (2022)
 Return of the SP1200 2 (2022)

Compilation albums
 Pete's Treats (1999)
 Good Life: The Best of Pete Rock & CL Smooth (with CL Smooth) (2003)
 Lost & Found: Hip Hop Underground Soul Classics (2003)

References

External links
 
 Pete Rock discography at Discogs
 
 Pete Rock's Tru Soul Record Label

 
1970 births
Living people
American rappers of Jamaican descent
Pete Rock
Pete Rock
American hip hop record producers
Pete Rock
Pete Rock
Pete Rock
Pete Rock
Pete Rock
Underground rappers
21st-century American rappers
Mount Vernon High School (New York) alumni
Barely Breaking Even artists